The 1978 NBA playoffs was the postseason tournament of the National Basketball Association's 1977-78 season. The tournament concluded with the Eastern Conference champion Washington Bullets defeating the Western Conference champion Seattle SuperSonics 4 games to 3 in the NBA Finals. Wes Unseld was named NBA Finals MVP. To date, it remains the only NBA title that the Bullets (since renamed the Wizards) have won.

It was the third NBA Finals appearance and first title for the Bullets, founded in 1961. The Sonics made the Finals for the first time in their 11-year existence. This would be the first of two straight meetings in the Finals between the Bullets and Sonics, with Seattle winning the title the next year.

This was the first time since the expansion of the playoff field to 10 teams in 1975 that neither conference champion had the benefit of a first-round bye by being one of the top two teams in the conference during the regular season. The 1979 Finals rematch between the Sonics and Bullets took place with both teams as the #1 seed in their respective conference.

The Denver Nuggets, one of the four former American Basketball Association teams to join the NBA the previous season, became the first of them to win an NBA playoff series, defeating the Milwaukee Bucks in a 7-game conference semifinal.

Bracket

First round

Eastern Conference first round

(3) Washington Bullets vs. (6) Atlanta Hawks

This was the third playoff meeting between these two teams, with both teams split the first two meetings while both teams were in Baltimore and St. Louis respectively.

(4) Cleveland Cavaliers vs. (5) New York Knicks

This was the first playoff meeting between these two teams.

Western Conference first round

(3) Phoenix Suns vs. (6) Milwaukee Bucks

This was the first playoff meeting between these two teams.

(4) Seattle SuperSonics vs. (5) Los Angeles Lakers

This was the first playoff meeting between these two teams.

Conference semifinals

Eastern Conference semifinals

(1) Philadelphia 76ers vs. (5) New York Knicks

This was the seventh playoff meeting between these two teams, with the 76ers winning four of the first six meetings.

(2) San Antonio Spurs vs. (3) Washington Bullets

This was the first playoff meeting between these two teams.

Western Conference semifinals

(1) Portland Trail Blazers vs. (4) Seattle SuperSonics

 Bill Walton's final game in a Portland Trail Blazer uniform.

This was the first playoff meeting between these two teams.

(2) Denver Nuggets vs. (6) Milwaukee Bucks

This was the first playoff meeting between these two teams.

Conference finals

Eastern Conference finals

(1) Philadelphia 76ers vs. (3) Washington Bullets

 After a jump ball with three seconds left, Doug Collins hits the game-tying shot at the buzzer to send it to OT.

This was the second playoff meeting between these two teams, with the Bullets winning the first meeting while in Baltimore.

Western Conference finals

(2) Denver Nuggets vs. (4) Seattle SuperSonics

This was the first playoff meeting between these two teams.

NBA Finals: (W4) Seattle SuperSonics vs. (E3) Washington Bullets

 "Downtown" Freddie Brown scores 16 of his points in the 4th quarter to lead the Sonics back from a 19-point deficit.

 This was the last time until 2016 that a road team defeated the home team in Game 7 the Finals.

This was the first playoff meeting between these two teams.

References

External links
 https://www.basketball-reference.com/playoffs/NBA_1978.html Basketball-Reference.com's 1978 NBA Playoffs page

National Basketball Association playoffs
Playoffs

fi:NBA-kausi 1977–1978#Pudotuspelit